Masar (Masár, Masár,  Masař) are occupational surnames literally meaning butcher in some Slavic languages. Notable people with the surname include:

Dušan Masár (born 1962), Czech former wrestler
 Ella Masar (born 1986), American-Canadian soccer player
 Felix Masár (born 1955), Czechoslovak canoeist
Vladimír Masár (born 1958), Slovak economist, the first Governor of National Bank of Slovakia

See also

Occupational surnames